Gerendong Bridge is a bridge that connects two areas in Bogor Regency, West Java, Indonesia; namely Rumpin district and Ciseeng district.

References

Bogor Regency
Buildings and structures in West Java
Bridges in Indonesia
Bridges completed in 2020
Post-independence architecture of Indonesia
Vertical lift bridges